Thomas Shirley Simons, Sr. (March 12, 1897 – August 1, 1963), commonly known as Shirley Simons was a prominent architect of Tyler, Texas.  He was born in 1897 at Taylor, Texas, and raised in Fort Worth, Texas.  He graduated from Rice Institute in 1919 with a Bachelor of Science in architecture.  He also served in the field artillery during World War I from September through November 1918.

After practicing with William Ward Watkin in Houston, Simons moved to Lufkin, Texas in 1922 where he established his own architecture practice.  In the late 1920s, he moved his architectural practice to Tyler, Texas.  He remained active as an architect in Tyler until his death in 1963.  Shirley's three sons (T. Shirley Simons, Jr., Edwin Simons, and Watson Townes Simons) later joined his architectural practice.

A number of Simons' works, including the Tyler City Hall, San Augustine County Courthouse and Jail, and Austin Daily Tribune Building, are listed on the National Register of Historic Places.

Works in Tyler, Texas
Tremont Place (1987), 615 Tremont Place, Tyler, TX 75701 (situated in the Azalea Residential Historic District) (Shirley Simons)
Bergfeld Park (tennis courts, amphitheater and restrooms), part of the Azalea Residential Historic District, 1400 Block South Broadway, Tyler, Texas
Robert and Mattie Fair House (1937), 905 South Chilton Avenue, Tyler, Texas (part of the Azalea Residential Historic District) (Shirley Simons, Sr. and Allen Campbell)
Hanson-Cooper House (1931), 312 E. Charnwood, Tyler, Texas
W. Howard and Vera Bryant House (1951), 2212 South Chilton Avenue, Tyler, Texas (part of the Azalea Residential Historic District)
Marvin United Methodist Church (1942 remodel and parsonage), 300 W. Erwin St., Tyler, Texas, NRHP-listed
Thomas and Edna Pollard House (1935), 801 Troup Highway, Tyler, Texas
Ramey House (1935 interior remodel), 605 S. Broadway, Tyler, Texas (Simons, Shirley), NRHP-listed
St. Gregory Elementary School, 400 South College Avenue, Tyler, Texas
St. John's AF & AM Lodge, 323 W. Front Street, Tyler, Texas (Simons, T. Shirley Sr.), NRHP-listed
Shirley Simons Residence, 118 West Fourth, Tyler, Texas (part of the Azalea Residential Historic District)
Tyler City Hall (1938), 212 N. Bonner Avenue, Tyler, Texas (Simons, T. Shirley, Sr.), NRHP-listed
Tyler Junior College original campus building plan
Tyler Little Theatre (1939), 1014 W. Houston, Tyler, Texas
Tyler U.S. Post Office and Courthouse, aka William M. Steger U.S. Courthouse (1934), 211 W. Ferguson Street, Tyler, Texas (Simons, Shirley), NRHP-listed
White House, aka The Castle (1929), 116 Lindsey Lane, Tyler, Texas
Willow Brook Country Club, 3205 West Erwin Street, Tyler, Texas
Witherup Home (1932), 212 West Dobbs Street, Tyler, Texas
Woman's Building (1931), 911 South Broadway, Tyler, Texas (part of the Azalea Residential Historic District) (Shirley Simons, Sr., and Sam R. Hill)

Works in Lufkin, Texas
Angelina Hotel, West Shepherd and South First, Lufkin, Texas
Bowers-Felts House, 1213 Lotus Lane, Lufkin, Texas (Simons, Shirley), NRHP-listed
Brookshire, Houston-Yeates House, 304 E. Howe Street, Lufkin, Texas (Simons, Shirley), NRHP-listed
Central Ward Grammar School, Lufkin, Texas (demolished)
Everitt-Cox House (1922 remodel), 418 Moore, Lufkin, Texas (Simons, Shirley), NRHP-listed
First National Bank Building, northeast corner of Lufkin Avenue and First Street, Lufkin, Texas
Kurth Memorial Library, Cotton Square facing Lufkin Avenue, Lufkin, Texas
Kurth Ward Grammar School, Lufkin, Texas
Pines Theatre, 113 South First Street, Lufkin, Texas, NRHP-listed
School on South Raguet, Lufkin, Texas
Shands Gymnasium, Lufkin, Texas (demolished)

Works in other cities
Austin Daily Tribune Building (1941), 920 Colorado, Austin, Texas (Simons, Shirley), NRHP-listed
Houston Museum of Art
Nacogdoches High School Gym and Auditorium, Nacogdoches, Texas
San Augustine County Courthouse and Jail (1927), Courthouse Square, San Augustine, Texas (Simons, Shirley), NRHP-listed
Stephen F. Austin University campus expansion  (classrooms, administration buildings, president's residence, library, auditorium and fine arts building, men's and women's dormitory), Nacogdoches, Texas
The Ashcroft House, 333 College Street, Sulphur Springs, Texas (a Recorded Texas Historic Landmark)
University of Texas Student Health Center, Austin, Texas

References

20th-century American architects
Architects from Texas
Rice University alumni
People from Tyler, Texas
1897 births
1963 deaths
People from Lufkin, Texas